Edgardo Obregón (born 1999)) is an American soccer player who currently plays for Florida Atlantic University in NCAA Division 1.

Biography
Obregón was born on 30 May 1999, in Miami, Florida, to Mexican parents. As a kid, nicknamed Gato ("Cat"), he played for and represented  in friendly, youth tournaments the teams of Club America, F.C. Barcelona and A.C. Milan.

His designated position is attacking midfielder, the same as his reported idol, Kaká.

In 2008, there were media reports that he committed to A.C. Milan, although the club did not make any official announcement. In 2009, FIFA strengthened its oversight of transfers of under-age football players. All transfers of under-age players must henceforth be submitted to and  approved by a sub-committee of the FIFA Players’ Status Committee, along with any applications for a minor player to be registered for the first time in a country where they are not a national. FIFA's toughened stance on underage players' signings was behind their April 2, 2014, decision to impose on Barcelona "a 14-month transfer ban for breaking rules on signing international players under 18," along with a fine of 450,000 Swiss Francs.

References

External links
Weston F.C. official website

1999 births
Living people
Mexican footballers
Association football midfielders
Soccer players from Miami
USL League Two players
Reinhardt Eagles men's soccer players
Weston FC players
American soccer players
American sportspeople of Mexican descent